Voyager is a discontinued web browser for the Amiga range of computers, developed by VaporWare.

Voyager supports HTML 3.2 and some HTML 4, JavaScript, frames, SSL, Flash, and various other Internet Explorer and Netscape Navigator features.

Voyager is also available for the MorphOS and CaOS operating systems.

Voyager 3
In May 1999 Oliver Wagner of VaporWare gave details of the upcoming Voyager 3 to Amiga Format, with planned new features including support for JavaScript, DOM (based on Internet Explorer's model), and CSS.

Voyager 3 was generally well-received, with Amiga Format praising its fast JavaScript execution and rapid table layout, but criticising its 'virtually unusable' print function and out-of-date documentation.

See also

 AMosaic
 AWeb
 IBrowse
 OWB

References

External links
 Official Website

Web browsers for AmigaOS
1996 software
MorphOS software
Discontinued web browsers